Somerton railway station (not to be confused with Fritwell & Somerton) was a railway station situated on the Great Western Railway's Langport and Castle Cary Railway. It served the town of Somerton in Somerset, England.

History
Somerton station opened to the public on 2 July 1906, in a cutting adjoining the town centre. The station had two signal boxes and a goods shed, however none of these are still standing. The station stopped handling passenger services on 10 September 1962  but continued to serve freight traffic until closing altogether on 6 July 1964.

In recent times there have been various aspirations to re-open the station by local people, including former local MP David Heath - but until that may happen, the only real sign of the station today is a -long siding which had been built originally to let goods trains be overtaken. This siding is still used occasionally by Network Rail during night-time engineering works.

Description
The station lay just behind the West Street girder bridge and ran all the way down to the Perry Hill area of the town. The main building was sited on the eastbound platform, with the goods shed at the west end of that platform. The original signal box was placed just opposite this platform, but a second signal box was opened in 1942 to control and monitor some new loop lines and sidings which created to the west of the station itself.

Various local businesses used the station as a site for their companies, with a cattle market, an animal and corn feed mill, a coal yard and even a fish merchant all having stood on the site.

The site today
Up until the mid-1980s when the original signal box was demolished, a few station huts still stood on the site, but these have all ceased to exist.

Proposed reopening
A May 2018 transport strategy suggested that a station should be opened to serve the Somerton and Langport area, and such a plan was again mentioned in the National Infrastructure Strategy in November 2020.

Services

References

Disused railway stations in Somerset
Former Great Western Railway stations
Railway stations in Great Britain opened in 1906
Railway stations in Great Britain closed in 1964
1906 establishments in England
1964 disestablishments in England
Somerton, Somerset